Stauranthus is a genus of flowering plants belonging to the family Rutaceae.

Its native range is Southern Mexico to Central America.

Species:
Stauranthus conzattii 
Stauranthus perforatus

References

Rutaceae
Rutaceae genera